Rabbi Chaim Tzvi Teitelbaum (December 28, 1879 – January 21, 1926) (6 shevat 5686 on the Hebrew calendar), the Sigheter Rebbe, author of Atzei Chaim, was the oldest son of Rabbi Chananya Yom Tov Lipa Teitelbaum, the Kedushas Yom Tov. He was the elder brother of Rabbi Joel Teitelbaum, and the father of Rabbi Moshe Teitelbaum, both rebbes of Satmar.

Biography
Chaim Tzvi Teitelbaum married Bracha Sima Halberstam, a sister of Rebbitzen Chaya Freidel Halberstam, who was the wife of Rabbi Ben Zion Halberstam, the second Bobover Rebbe. Together, they had four children. One was Rabbi Moshe Teitelbaum, the late Satmar Rebbe. Another was Rabbi Yekutiel Yehuda Teitelbaum, who succeeded him as Sigheter Rebbe until he was murdered in the Holocaust. One daughter married Rabbi Yekusiel Yehudah Halberstam, the Sanz-Klausenburg'er Rebbe, but she also was murdered in the Holocaust. Their youngest daughter, Chana, married Rabbi Yechiel Yehuda Isaacson, who was known as the Rav of Achuza-Haifa.

Works
Atzei Chaim – a Hasidic commentary on the Torah
Atzei Chaim – commentary on moadim
 Atzei Chaim – commentary on meshechtes Gittin
 Atzei Chaim – Shalios utshovos responsa
 Atzei Chaim – commentary on hilchos mikvahos
 Atzei Chaim – commentary on Tehilem

Students
Rabbi Shlomo Zalmen Friedman, Rabbi of Tenke (Hungary, and later in Brooklyn, New York)
Rabbi Mordechai Wulliger, author of many books, including – Otzer Hashas Kovetz Hatosfes Pardes Mordechai Tefillos Mordechai
 Rabbi David Hoch
 Rabbi Chaim Shmuel Kleinman
 Rabbi Avrohom Yosef Kleinman

References

1879 births
1926 deaths
Hungarian Hasidic rabbis
Rebbes of Siget
Teitelbaum family